The 1998 International Rules Series was the fifth annual series between Gaelic footballers from the Gaelic Athletic Association and Australian rules footballers from the Australian Football League and the first since it was cancelled in 1990. It was part of a four-year agreement. Ireland and Australia both won a game however Ireland won the overall series by 10 points in aggregate.

Results 
Both tests were played at GAA Headquarters (Croke Park in Dublin). The total series attendance was 58,121.

Sources for the following details: Footy Stats  Source for scores in the second test: International Rules Gold (TG4)

First test

Second test

Squads 

Source: Official Series match-day programme

Jim Stynes Medal – Stephen Silvagni

See also 
 International rules football
 Gaelic football
 Australian rules football
 Comparison of Australian rules football and Gaelic football

References

External links 
 Tarik's International Rules Football
 Official GAA website
 Official AFL website
 RTÉ International Rules section
 Hogan Stand International Rules section
 AFL International Rules section

International Rules Series
International Rules Series
International Rules series
International sports competitions hosted by Ireland